Brian Hill is a Canadian entrepreneur and the founder and Executive Chair of Vancouver-based clothing company Aritzia. After the opening of its first location in 1984, the company has grown steadily in its thirty years of operation, servicing a demographic of young women and employing more than 2,300 staff. Unlike most comparable retailers such as H&M, Aritzia designs and produces many in house brands including: TNA, Talula, Babaton, Wilfred, Wilfred Free, Community, Le Fou, La Notte, Sunday Best, Paradise Mine, The Castings, SIXELEVEN and Auxiliary.

Early life

Family 
Brian Hill was raised in Vancouver, British Columbia, Canada by his father Jim Hill, the founder of the luxury retail company Hills of Kerrisdale. Brian worked at his father's retail store through his adolescence, often doing simple maintenance tasks, such as folding, and window washing. He learned about the retail business under the mentorship of his father, Jim, and uncle, Forbes Hill.

Education 
Following his graduation from high school, attended the commerce program at Queen's University. After poor grades caused him to be kicked out of the faculty of commerce, he graduated from the faculty of economics. Upon graduation, Hill moved back home to Vancouver.

Career

The Founding and Expansion of Aritzia 
Shortly after returning from school, in 1984, Hill, with his brother Ross, opened the first Aritzia boutique in Oakridge Centre, an upscale shopping mall in  Vancouver, BC. Hill claimed that he saw a gap in the market, which he intended to fill, lying somewhere between luxury clothing retailers for young women and trendy retailers for young girls. In order to fill this gap in the market, Hill felt that it was necessary to develop in-house brands that could deliver what was not already available to consumers, the six private brands: Wilfred, TNA, Talula, Sunday Best, Community and Babaton accompanied by their two accessory brands SIXELEVEN and Auxiliary are responsible for 80% of the company's sales. Nearing the end of the 1990s, Aritzia was expanded nationally, and then in 2005, it was expanded internationally to establish boutiques in the United States. American cities with Aritzia locations include Seattle, San Francisco, Los Angeles, Chicago, Boston and New York. Figuring out how to expand into California and Florida brought some challenges due to the warm nature of the fall and winter clothing lines. Despite this obstacle, Aritzia has expanded to 105 locations across North America as of Nov. 28, 2021.

Charity involvement 
In 2007, Brian's wife, Andrea Thomas Hill founded the organization Cause We Care, a foundation designed to provide support to single mothers in the Vancouver area who may be struggling to provide for their children. Aritzia is a sponsor and advocate of the organization. Brian and Andrea support the BC Children's Hospital Foundation and the Vancouver Art Gallery.

References 

Canadian chief executives
Queen's University at Kingston alumni
Living people
Year of birth missing (living people)